The Phlegraean Islands are an archipelago in the Gulf of Naples and the Campania region of southern Italy.

The name is derived from the common affiliation to the geologic area of the Phlegraean Fields.

Geography
It consists of the islands of Ischia, Procida, Vivara, and Nisida. They are part of the Campanian volcanic arc and Campanian Archipelago (Neapolitan Archipelago), off the coast of Naples in the Tyrrhenian Sea.

The archipelago is within the Metropolitan City of Naples.

The island of Capri is usually excluded, as it does not belong to the same geologic formations.

History
In the classical epoch, some Phlegraean Islands were called Pithecussae, the Greek  (‘islands of monkeys’). 
A Greek myth tells of two brigands, the Cercopes of Ephesus, who played pranks on Zeus, who then punished them by turning them into monkeys and exiling them to the islands of Aenaria (Ischia) and Prochyta (Procida).

Legend had the monster Typhon buried under Ischia, and the Giant Mimas buried under Procida. Such stories might be significant as a clue to how the ancient Greeks attempted to account for the volcanism of the whole area. The resulting changes in the topography of the islands were due to the frequent intervention of deities.

See also
 List of islands of Italy

References

Islands of Campania
Archipelagoes of Italy
Archipelagoes of the Mediterranean Sea
Campanian volcanic arc
Metropolitan City of Naples
Volcanoes of the Tyrrhenian
Ischia
Phlegraean Fields